Melicytus dentatus, the tree violet, is a shrub that is native to south-east Australia. It grows up to 4 metres high and has branchlets that are often armed with spines and have leaves that are 5 to 50 mm long and sometimes toothed.  The flowers appear in spring and summer and are pale yellow, 3 to 5 mm in length, and have petals that are recurved at the tips. These are followed by pale green to purple-black, rounded berries which are 4 to 5 mm in diameter.

The berries are consumed by Cunningham's spiny-tailed skinks.

The species occurs in New South Wales, Victoria, Tasmania and South Australia.

References

dentatus
Flora of New South Wales
Flora of South Australia
Flora of Tasmania
Flora of Victoria (Australia)
Malpighiales of Australia
Plants described in 1824